Nicole Hassler (6 January 1941 – 19 November 1996) was a French figure skater. She was the 1963 World bronze medalist, the 1963 European silver medalist and the 1964-1966 European bronze medalist. She represented France at the 1960 Winter Olympics, where she placed 11th and at the 1964 Winter Olympics, where she placed 4th. She was born in Chamonix and was the daughter of Albert Hassler.

Competitive highlights

References

 Sports-reference profile
 
 

1941 births
1996 deaths
Olympic figure skaters of France
Figure skaters at the 1960 Winter Olympics
Figure skaters at the 1964 Winter Olympics
French female single skaters
People from Chamonix
World Figure Skating Championships medalists
European Figure Skating Championships medalists
Sportspeople from Haute-Savoie
20th-century French women